Hussein Iashaish (born 6 August 1995) is a Jordanian boxer. He competed in the men's super heavyweight event at the 2016 Summer Olympics. He defeated Mihai Nistor of Romania in the round of 16. He was then defeated by eventual gold medalist Tony Yoka of France in the quarterfinals. Ishaish was the flagbearer for Jordan during the Parade of Nations.

His brother, Zeyad, is also a boxer.

References

External links
 

1995 births
Living people
Jordanian male boxers
Olympic boxers of Jordan
Boxers at the 2016 Summer Olympics
Boxers at the 2020 Summer Olympics
Sportspeople from Amman
Boxers at the 2014 Asian Games
Asian Games competitors for Jordan
Super-heavyweight boxers
21st-century Jordanian people